Queen Celestine (born 18 March 1992) is a Nigerian model and chef who was crowned the Most Beautiful Girl in Nigeria Universe 2014 and represented Nigeria at the Miss Universe 2014 pageant.

Early life
Queen is a student at Madonna University and former ambassador of Edo in Nigeria.

Pageantry

Miss Nigeria 2013
Queen participated in the Miss Nigeria 2013 pageant and was the First runner-up.

Most Beautiful Girl in Nigeria (MGBN) 2014
Queen won Miss Amity and was crowned as the MGBN Universe (Most Beautiful Girl in Nigeria) 2014 on July 19, 2014. At same event she was crowned together with the first winner who was crowned as MGBN World 2014, Iheoma Nnadi.

Miss Universe 2014
Queen competed at the Miss Universe 2014 pageant and won as Miss Congeniality.

References

External links
MBGN website

1992 births
Living people
Nigerian beauty pageant winners
Miss Universe 2014 contestants
Most Beautiful Girl in Nigeria winners